The Zambian Charity Shield officially called  Samuel ‘Zoom’ Ndhlovu Charity Shield since 2003 is a season opener match between the champions of the previous Super League season and the holders of the ABSA Cup. If the Super League champions also won the ABSA Cup then the league runners-up provide the opposition. The fixture was first played in the 1967 season. The current holders are Zesco United, who defeated Lusaka Dynamos 4-0 in the 2021 match.

Records
 The most successful teams in the competition are Nkana  (18 outright wins), Kabwe Warriors (7 outright wins), Power Dynamos (5 outright wins)
 The highest scoring game was Nkana 4-0 win against INDENI in 2000.

History

Winners

By number of wins (clubs)

References

 
National association football supercups
Recurring sporting events established in 1967
!Charity shield
1967 establishments in Zambia